The Royal Air Force Memorial is a military memorial on the Victoria Embankment in central London, dedicated to the memory of the casualties of the Royal Air Force in World War I (and, by extension, all subsequent conflicts). Unveiled in 1923, it became a Grade II listed structure in 1958, and was upgraded to Grade II* in 2018. It is considered to be the official memorial of the RAF and related services.  

It is sited at Whitehall Steps, near Cleopatra's Needle, between the north-bank ends of Charing Cross Bridge and Westminster Bridge, and directly to the east of the main Ministry of Defence building on Whitehall.   The Fleet Air Arm Memorial and the Battle of Britain Monument are nearby.

Background
A committee to erect an RAF memorial was first established in February 1919, and relaunched in January 1920, led by Lord Hugh Cecil and Air Chief Marshal Sir Hugh Trenchard.  Funds to erect a memorial were raised by the RAF Memorial Fund subsequently known as the RAF Benevolent Fund.  The memorial was designed by Sir Reginald Blomfield.

The memorial was unveiled on 16 July 1923 by the Prince of Wales (later Edward VIII).  The Chief of the Air Staff traditionally places a wreath at the memorial on Battle of Britain Day, 15 September, each year.

Description
The memorial comprises a tapering Portland stone pylon topped by zodiacal globe bearing a gilded eagle, taken from the RAF's badge, with raised wings, facing east towards the River Thames and nominally towards France.  The eagle was sculpted by William Reid Dick and cast by the Parlanti Foundry. Blomfield used similar pylons for Torquay War Memorial and Luton War Memorial, topped by different devices.

The pylon bears inscriptions on the sides facing the Embankment to the west and to the river to the east.  Further inscriptions were added after the Second World War, unveiled by Trenchard on 15 September 1946.

Inscriptions

On the west side of the pylon facing the Embankment, the words "Per Ardua" are picked out in gold, and lower down there is the RAF insignia, and a dedication: , and a quotation from Exodus, chapter 19: . Further down, on the base, is another inscription . The side facing the river bears the RAF insignia again and the inscription: . Thus, the monument was not initially created purely for the RAF, but for all 'Air Services' that served during World War One.

See also 
Grade II* listed war memorials in England

Other Royal Air Force Memorials 
 Royal Air Force Memorial, Albany, Georgia
 South African Air Force Memorial, Swartkop, Tshwane

Other RAF memorials
 Air Forces Memorial
 RAF Bomber Command Memorial

References

 Royal Air Force Benevolent Fund (RAFBF)
 Royal Air Force Memorial by Philip Ward-Jackson, Royal Air Force Benevolent Fund
 
 Imperial War Museums
 London Remembers

1923 establishments in England
1923 sculptures
Sculptures of birds
British military memorials and cemeteries
Buildings and structures completed in 1923
Grade II* listed statues in the City of Westminster
Grade II* listed monuments and memorials
Military memorials in London
Outdoor sculptures in London
Reginald Blomfield buildings
Royal Air Force memorials
Stone sculptures in the United Kingdom
Tourist attractions in the City of Westminster
World War I memorials in England
World War II memorials in England
Victoria Embankment